MOWSE (for MOlecular Weight SEarch) is a method for identification of proteins from the molecular weight of peptides created by proteolytic digestion and measured with mass spectrometry.

Development
The MOWSE algorithm was developed by Darryl Pappin  at the Imperial Cancer Research Fund and Alan Bleasby at the SERC Daresbury Laboratory. The probability-based MOWSE score formed the basis of development of Mascot, a proprietary software for protein identification from mass spectrometry data.

See also
Peptide mass fingerprinting
Mascot (software)
Genome-based peptide fingerprint scanning

References

Bioinformatics
Mass spectrometry software
Proteomics
Science and technology in Cheshire

de:MOWSE